Căzănești is a town in Ialomița County, Muntenia, Romania. It is situated on the left bank of the river Ialomița, 30 km west of Slobozia.

References

Populated places in Ialomița County
Localities in Muntenia
Towns in Romania